Taihe Tujia Ethnic Township is an ethnic township for Tujia people that is under the administration of Fengjie County, Chongqing, China. , it administers Taihe Residential Community and the following seven villages:
Taiping Village
Gaoqiao Village
Jianshan Village
Liangjia Village
Shiban Village
Shipan Village
Jinzi Village

References 

Township-level divisions of Chongqing
Fengjie County
Ethnic townships of the People's Republic of China
Tujia autonomous areas